Salasco is a comune (municipality) in the Province of Vercelli in the Italian region Piedmont, located about  northeast of Turin and about  west of Vercelli.

The municipality of Salasco contains the frazione Selve, a typical cascina a corte of the Vercellese rice paddy fields landscape.

Salasco borders the following municipalities: Crova, Lignana, Sali Vercellese, San Germano Vercellese, and Vercelli.

Selve, together with the nearby Tenuta Veneria (comune of Lignana), was a filming location for Bitter Rice, a 1949 neorealistic movie starring Silvana Mangano and Vittorio Gassman.

References

Cities and towns in Piedmont